The 1908–09 Cincinnati Bearcats men's basketball team represented the University of Cincinnati during the 1908–09 college men's basketball season. The head coach was Amos Foster, coaching his fifth season with the Bearcats.

Schedule

|-

References

Cincinnati Bearcats men's basketball seasons
Cincinnati
Cincinnati Bearcats men's basketball team
Cincinnati Bearcats men's basketball team